Combined Oxford and Cambridge Universities cricket teams were formed at intervals between 1839 and 1992, often playing against touring international teams. Mostly the team consisted of students who were current members of either Cambridge University Cricket Club or Oxford University Cricket Club, although four matches between 1874 and 1893 included past and present students. A Combined Universities side played in the Benson & Hedges Cup between 1975 and 1998. Initially this was referred to as Oxford and Cambridge Universities or Oxbridge.

History
The team was considered a first-class cricket team from 1839, with some of its matches being given first-class status. The team played a total of 22 first-class matches, including the four in which past and present students were included.

The first Oxford and Cambridge combined team match was against MCC at Lord's in 1839 and in 1848 they played a game against Gentlemen of England at the same venue. The team undertook overseas tours in the middle part of the twentieth century, but played only two first-class games outside Britain, both being at Sabina Park, during the tour of Jamaica in 1938.
	
After a thirty-year gap, the Oxford and Cambridge team returned to first-class cricket in 1968, with a match against the touring Australians. They played another 11 matches against touring teams at either the University Parks in Oxford or Fenner's in Cambridge; their last match was in 1992 against the Pakistani tourists.

See also
 List of Oxford and Cambridge Universities cricket team players

References

English first-class cricket teams
Student cricket in the United Kingdom